Mawlaik is a town in Mawlaik District, Sagaing Region in north-west Myanmar, along the Chindwin River.

Etymology
" Mawlaik" derives from the Shan language term "Mawlek", which means "iron mine."

Climate

References

Township capitals of Myanmar
Populated places in Mawlaik District
Mawlaik Township